In mathematics, a factorisation of a free monoid is a sequence of subsets of words with the property that every word in the free monoid can be written as a concatenation of elements drawn from the subsets.  The Chen–Fox–Lyndon theorem states that the Lyndon words furnish a factorisation.  The Schützenberger theorem relates the definition in terms of a multiplicative property to an additive property.

Let A* be the free monoid on an alphabet A.  Let Xi be a sequence of subsets of A* indexed by a totally ordered index set I.  A factorisation of a word w in A* is an expression

Some authors reverse the order of the inequalities.

Chen–Fox–Lyndon theorem
A Lyndon word over a totally ordered alphabet A is a word that is lexicographically less than all its rotations.  The Chen–Fox–Lyndon theorem states that every string may be formed in a unique way by concatenating a non-increasing sequence of Lyndon words.  Hence taking Xl to be the singleton set {l} for each Lyndon word l, with the index set L of Lyndon words ordered lexicographically, we obtain a factorisation of A*.  Such a factorisation can be found in linear time.

Hall words
The Hall set provides a factorization.
Indeed, Lyndon words are a special case of Hall words. The article on Hall words provides a sketch of all of the mechanisms needed to establish a proof of this factorization.

Bisection
A bisection of a free monoid is a factorisation with just two classes X0, X1.

Examples:
A = {a,b}, X0 = {a*b}, X1 = {a}.

If X, Y are disjoint sets of non-empty words, then (X,Y) is a bisection of A* if and only if

As a consequence, for any partition P, Q of A+ there is a unique bisection (X,Y) with X a subset of P and Y a subset of Q.

Schützenberger theorem
This theorem states that a sequence Xi of subsets of A* forms a factorisation if and only if two of the following three statements hold:
 Every element of A* has at least one expression in the required form;
 Every element of A* has at most one expression in the required form;
 Each conjugate class C meets just one of the monoids Mi = Xi* and the elements of C in Mi are conjugate in Mi.

See also
 Sesquipower

References

Formal languages